This is a list of mayors of the City of Stonnington local government area in  Melbourne, Victoria, Australia, which was formed in 1994 by the amalgamation of the City of Malvern and the City of Prahran.

Commissioners (1994-1996)

Mayors (1996 to present)
From 1996 until 2004, the annual election of the mayor for the following 12 months occurred in March. New legislation effective from 2004 onwards changed the date of the election of the mayor to November or December. There was a truncated transitional term of office from March to November 2004.

See also
Malvern Town Hall
List of mayors of Malvern
List of mayors of Prahran

External links
Stonnington City Council

References
Stonnington Mayors and Councillors: Past and Present

Stonnington
Mayors Stonnington
City of Stonnington